Guy Antony Chambers (born 12 January 1963) is an English songwriter, musician and record producer, best known for his work with Robbie Williams.

Education
Chambers attended Quarry Bank Comprehensive School sixth form in Liverpool. From 18, he studied composition and piano at the Guildhall School of Music, London.

Career
Chambers joined World Party in 1986. He co-wrote 'Love Street' with Karl Wallinger on the band's album Goodbye Jumbo. He appeared on The Mission's album Carved in Sand, providing the orchestral arrangement and piano for the song "Grapes of Wrath", and was producer for the short-lived group Stress with their debut album.

In 1992, Chambers formed his own band The Lemon Trees and wrote, produced and performed with them until they disbanded in 1995. The band only released one album - Open Book. Following the end of The Lemon Trees, Chambers wrote with Cathy Dennis on Am I the Kinda Girl? and other albums before meeting Robbie Williams in January 1997. Their first work together, Life thru a Lens, was released in September 1997. In the next five years, they produced four other albums: I've Been Expecting You, Sing When You're Winning, Swing When You're Winning and Escapology. Following 2002's Escapology, both Williams and Chambers went on to collaborate with other writers and artists for the next ten years, eventually reuniting for 2013's Swings Both Ways, 2017's The Heavy Entertainment Show and 2019's The Christmas Present.

In 2016, Chambers and Williams teamed up with Chris Heath to compose the music and lyrics for the Royal Shakespeare Company's musical adaptation of David Walliams’ book The Boy in the Dress, which opened in 2019-20 at the Royal Shakespeare Theatre, Stratford-Upon-Avon. In 2018, Chambers wrote a children’s folk opera based on the Oscar Wilde short story "The Selfish Giant". He released his debut solo piano album Go Gentle Into the Light on 3 May 2019. It reached number 49 on the UK Albums Chart.

Collaboration with Robbie Williams
Chambers co-wrote a number of Williams' tracks, including "Rock DJ", "Feel", "Millennium", "Let Me Entertain You" and "Angels".

In November 2012, Chambers and Williams were reunited onstage for the latter's shows at the O2 Arena.

The release of Swings Both Ways was announced by Williams in September 2013. It was released in the UK by Island Records on 18 November. The album featured cover versions of well known songs, as well as six new tracks written by Williams and Chambers, who also produced the album. Swings Both Ways also featured duets between Williams and Lily Allen, Michael Bublé, Kelly Clarkson, Olly Murs and Rufus Wainwright. In 2014, Chambers and Williams toured Swings Both Ways, covering Europe, Asia and Australia.

In 2015, Chambers joined Williams on the road for the Let Me Entertain You Tour. The tour began in Spain and travelled through Europe and Asia, reaching Australia in October. They also played at various festivals throughout the summer. In 2016, Williams and Chambers collaborated on The Heavy Entertainment Show which preceded The Heavy Entertainment Show Tour, and in 2019, they collaborated once again on The Christmas Present. Chambers co-wrote and produced tracks off Under the Radar Volume 1, 2 and 3 comprising demos, B-sides and rarities.

Other collaborations and projects 
In 2002, Chambers wrote "Staring Into Space" for BBMak's second album. In 2003, he co wrote "Melt" with Melanie C on the album Reason, which he co-produced along with Richard Flack.

In 2004, Chambers worked with Beverley Knight, co-writing the songs "Affirmation" (also the title track of the album), "No-One Ever Loves in Vain", "Under the Same Sun" and the top ten single "Come As You Are". He reunited with Knight on the 2009 album 100% and co-wrote the title track "Soul Survivor" that Knight duetted on with Chaka Khan. That same year he co-wrote "Shine" with Kara DioGuardi for Hilary Duff. He also co-wrote and co produced "Silent Movie" with Natasha Bedingfield for her album Unwritten. In the same year, he co-produced American singer-songwriter Aslyn's debut album Lemon Love, and co-wrote the song "Here", and co-wrote 7 songs on Brian McFadden's debut album — including the single "Real to Me", and the follow up singles "Irish Son" and "Demons".

In 2007, he co-wrote four songs on Anastacia's fourth album Heavy Rotation. He teamed up with Christophe Willem on his second record Cafeine, co-wrote with Matt Hales from Aqualung on the single "Heartbox" and with Cathy Dennis on "Sensitized", a duet with Kylie Minogue, for Dennis' solo record, released in 2009. Additional work that year involved new work with British artists Julian Perretta, Katie Melua, Random Impulse, Marlon Roudette and Taio Cruz.

In 2010, Chambers began working on the single "World Behind My Wall" released by pop/rock band Tokio Hotel. Chambers also co-wrote Tokio Hotel's track, "Pain of Love" which featured on their album, Humanoid. Katie Melua's album The House, released 24 May 2010, included five co-written songs for her new album produced by William Orbit, including "I'd Like to Kill You", "The Flood" (first single), "A Happy Place", "A Moment of Madness" and "Tiny Alien". Chambers also worked on the track "Virtual Friend", co-written with Armin van Buuren for his 2010 album, Mirage.

In 2011, Chambers worked on new material with English singer-songwriters Katy B and Charlene Soraia. He also teamed up with Example, co-writing the song "Microphone" which featured on Example's album, Playing in the Shadows. In the same year, Chambers worked with Marlon Roudette, producing and co-writing her single "New Age". A track Chambers had written with Julian Lennon titled "Never Let You Go" was released on Lennon's album Everything Changes. Chambers collaborated with BBC2 for two three-part programmes: Goldie's Band: By Royal Appointment airing in April and Secrets of a Pop Song which aired throughout July. Through the series, Chambers worked alongside Mark Ronson to create a single, singer-songwriter Rufus Wainwright to create a ballad, and British band Noisettes to compose an anthem. Chambers & Wainwright's "World War III" features on the digital version of Wainwright's album Out of the Game.

Chambers has collaborated with Sophie Hunter on two studio albums: the French-language The Isis Project (2005) and the English-language Songs for a Boy (2011).

In 2013, Chambers collaborated with Maverick Sabre in his new West London studio on new material for the artist, as well as working on new material with Rufus Wainwright, and co-writing "Out of Control" with Miles Kane, a track from Kane's second studio album Don't Forget Who You Are. In 2014, Chambers wrote "Crying for No Reason" with Katy B. In 2016, Chambers collaborated again with Kylie Minogue, Marlon Roudette, and Rufus Wainwright, and wrote and recorded with John Newman.

In 2019 Chambers collaborated with Robbie Williams on the music and lyrics for RSC stage show The Boy in the Dress, the stage adaptation of David Walliams's book of the same name.

Charity work 
On 25 October 2012, Chambers, Steve Rotheram MP and Kenny Dalglish called a press conference in the Houses of Parliament to announce the release of the charity single "He Ain't Heavy, He's My Brother" – a cover of the Hollies track which was aiming to raise funds and awareness for the campaign for justice for the Hillsborough families who lost 96 loved ones in the football disaster of 1989. The single was released on 17 December 2012 and went on to take the Christmas number one position for 2012 on the UK Singles Chart.

Discography

Solo albums
 Go Gentle Into the Light (2019) No. 49 UK

Production work
Chambers has contributed as a musician, producer and/or writer to the following:

Albums

 The Christmas Present (2019) – Robbie Williams
  Under the Radar Volume 3 – (2019)Robbie Williams
 Under the Radar Volume 2 (2017) – Robbie Williams
 The Heavy Entertainment Show (2016) – Robbie Williams
 Under the Radar Volume 1 (2014) – Robbie Williams
 Swings Both Ways (2013) – Robbie Williams
 Don't Forget Who You Are (2013) – Miles Kane
 The Shocking Miss Emerald (2013) – Caro Emerald
 Femme Schmidt (2012) – SCHMIDT
 Out of the Game (2012) – Rufus Wainwright
 A Holiday Carole (2011) – Carole King
 Battleground (2011) – The Wanted
 Playing in the Shadows (2011) – Example
 Matter Fixed (2011) – Marlon Roudette
 Songs for a Boy (2011) – Sophie Hunter
 100% (2011) – Beverley Knight
 The Sea (2011) – Melanie C
 The Wanted (2010) – The Wanted
 In and Out of Consciousness: Greatest Hits 1990–2010 (2010) – Robbie Williams
 Mirage (2010) – Armin van Buuren
 The House (2010) – Katie Melua
 Caféine (2010) – Christophe Willem
 Reality Killed the Video Star (2009) – Robbie Williams
 Humanoid (2009) – Tokio Hotel
 Love Is Dead (2009) – Kerli
 Boombox (2009) – Kylie Minogue
 Tina!: Her Greatest Hits (2008) – Tina Turner
 Heavy Rotation (2008) – Anastacia
 I Am (2008) – Monrose
 e2 (2008) – Eros Ramazzotti
 MP3 (2008) – M. Pokora
 X (2007) – Kylie Minogue
 This Delicate Thing We've Made (2007) – Darren Hayes
 Music City Soul (2007) – Beverley Knight
 This Time (2007) – Melanie C
 Welcome to Reality (2007) – Ross Copperman
 The Orange Album (2007) – Stefy
 Forever Begins Tonight (2006) – Patrizio Buanne
 What Love Is (2006) – Erin Boheme
 Voice (2006) – Beverley Knight
 Switch (2005) – INXS
 The Isis Project (2005) – Sophie Hunter

 Beautiful Intentions (re-release) (2005) – Melanie C
 Tissues and Issues (2005) – Charlotte Church
 Catching Tales (2005) – Jamie Cullum
 Lemon Love (2005) – Aslyn
 Nolita (2004) – Keren Ann
 Back To Bedlam (2004) – James Blunt
 Affirmation (2004) – Beverley Knight
 Irish Son (2004) – Brian McFadden
 Unwritten (2004) – Natasha Bedingfield
 Mistaken Identity (2004) – Delta Goodrem
 Hilary Duff (2004) – Hilary Duff
 Andrea (2004) – Andrea Bocelli
 Ultimate Kylie (2004) – Kylie Minogue
 Greatest Hits (2004) – Robbie Williams
 Save Yourself (2004) – Speedway
 A Present For Everyone (2003) – Busted
 Careful What You Wish For (2003) – Texas
 Reason (2003) – Melanie C
 Fleshwounds (2003) – Skin
 Funky Dory (2003) – Rachel Stevens
 SoulO (2003) – Nick Lachey
 Live at Knebworth (2003) – Robbie Williams
 From Now On (2002) – Will Young
 Into Your Head (2002) – BBMak
 Escapology (2002) – Robbie Williams
 Love & Life (2001) – Diana Ross
 Swing When You're Winning (2001) – Robbie Williams
 Jardin Secret (2001) – Axelle Red
 Light Years (2000) – Kylie Minogue
 Sing When You're Winning (2000) – Robbie Williams
 Reload (1999) – Tom Jones
 The Live Adventures of the Waterboys (1999) – The Waterboys
 I've Been Expecting You (1998) – Robbie Williams
 Life Thru a Lens (1997) – Robbie Williams
 Egyptology (1997) – World Party
 Am I the Kinda Girl? (1996) – Cathy Dennis
 Bang! (1993) – World Party
 Stress (1991) – Stress
 Goodbye Jumbo (1990) – World Party

Singles

 "Only When We're Naked" (2017) – Zak Abel
 "Dream A Little Dream" (2013) – Robbie Williams
 "Go Gentle" (2013) – Robbie Williams
 "Tangled Up" (2013) – Caro Emerald
 "He Aint Heavy ... He's My Brother" (2012) – The Justice Collective
 "Single Tear" (2012) – Tyler James
 "New Age" (2011) – Marlon Roudette
 "Soul Survivor" (2010) – Beverley Knight
 "A Happy Place" (2010) – Katie Melua
 "The Flood" (2010) – Katie Melua
 "World Behind My Wall" (2010) – Tokio Hotel
 "Why Not Us" (2008) – Monrose
 "Naïve" (2007) – Axelle Red
 "Together We Are One" (2006) – Delta Goodrem
 "Afterglow" (2006) – INXS
 "Pretty Vegas" (2005) – INXS
 "First Day of My Life" (2005) – Melanie C
 "Come As You Are" (2004) – Beverley Knight
 "Real To Me" (2004) – Brian McFadden
 "Irish Son" (2004) – Brian McFadden
 "Out of the Blue" (2004) – Delta Goodrem

 Let's Take Our Time (2004) – Ryan Cabrera
 "I'll See It Through" (2003) – Texas
 "Sexed Up" (2003) – Robbie Williams
 "Something Beautiful" (2003) – Robbie Williams
 "Feel" (2002) – Robbie Williams
 "Somethin' Stupid" (2001) – Robbie Williams & Nicole Kidman
 "Better Man" (2001) – Robbie Williams
 "Eternity/The Road to Mandalay" (2001) – Robbie Williams
 "Let Love Be Your Energy" (2001) – Robbie Williams
 "Your Disco Needs You" (2001) – Kylie Minogue
 "Supreme" (2000) – Robbie Williams
 "Kids" (2000) – Robbie Williams & Kylie Minogue
 "Rock DJ" (2000) – Robbie Williams
 "Win Some Lose Some" (1999) – Robbie Williams
 "She's the One/It's Only Us" (1999) – Robbie Williams
 "Strong" (1999) – Robbie Williams
 "No Regrets" (1998) – Robbie Williams
 "Millennium" (1998) – Robbie Williams
 "Angels" (1997) – Robbie Williams
 "South of the Border" (1997) – Robbie Williams
 "Lazy Days" (1997) – Robbie Williams
 "Old Before I Die" (1997) – Robbie Williams

Films
 Walk Like a Panther (2017) 
 What a Man (2012) – "New Age" – Marlon Roudette
 Arthur (2011) – "Can't Buy You" – Mark Ronson & Daniel Merriweather
 Kinky Boots (2005)
 Fantastic Four (2005) – "Always Come Back To You" – Ryan Cabrera
 Raise Your Voice (2004) – "Shine" – Hilary Duff
 Love Actually (2003) – "I'll See It Through" – Texas
 Finding Nemo (2003) – "Beyond The Sea" – Robbie Williams
 Bridget Jones's Diary (2001) – "Have You Met Miss Jones?", "Not of This Earth" – Robbie Williams
 A Knight's Tale (2001) – "We Are the Champions" – Robbie Williams
 Bend It Like Beckham (2002) – "Dream The Dream" – Shaznay Lewis
 Lock, Stock & Two Smoking Barrels (1998) – "Man Machine" – Robbie Williams
 Nobody Someday (2002) – "Nobody Someday" – Robbie Williams
 Mean Machine (2001) – "Let Me Entertain You" – Robbie Williams

Orchestral arrangements
 Julian Cope – "Sunspots" (Fried 1984)
 Julian Cope – "Sunshine Playroom" (World Shut Your Mouth 1984)

References

External links
 Guychambers.com
 
Interview with Guy Chambers in International Songwriters Association's "Songwriter Magazine"

Living people
1963 births
English songwriters
English record producers
The Waterboys members
Ivor Novello Award winners
People from Hammersmith
Musicians from London
Alumni of the Guildhall School of Music and Drama
People educated at King David School, Liverpool
People educated at King David High School, Liverpool
Robbie Williams Band members
The Lemon Trees members